In group theory, a branch of mathematics, an opposite group is a way to construct a group from another group that allows one to define right action as a special case of left action.

Monoids, groups, rings, and algebras can be viewed as categories with a single object. The construction of the opposite category generalizes the opposite group, opposite ring, etc.

Definition 
Let  be a group under the operation .

If  is abelian, then it is equal to its opposite group. More generally, any antiautomorphism  gives rise to a corresponding isomorphism  via , since

Group action 
Let  be an object in some category, and  be a right action.

See also 
 Opposite ring
 Opposite category

External links 
 http://planetmath.org/oppositegroup

Group theory
Representation theory